Village is an electoral ward of Trafford, Greater Manchester, covering the eastern part of the village of Timperley, including the Village Centre, and part of Brooklands.

Upon the seat's creation in 1973, the slate was split between 2 Labour councillors and 1 Liberal. At elections during the rest of the 1970s, the Conservatives eventually gained all three seats. In the 1980s and 1990s, the Conservatives fared less well while they were in Government, and the Liberals (latterly the Liberal Democrats) won the seat at most elections until 2010, the exceptions being 1983, 1987 and 1990.

In 2011, The Conservative candidate Laura Evans won in the ward for her party for the first time in 21 years. Though she successfully defended her seat in 2015, the Conservatives wouldn't make a gain in the ward until 2018, despite losing seats in other wards on the authority.

Incumbent Councillor Ray Bowker, first elected in 1973, died in January 2020.

Councillors 
Three councillors serve the ward: Shaun Ennis (Lib Dem), Julian Newgrosh (Lib Dem) and Linda Blackburn (Con) who was elected in May 2021 after her previous ward of Davyhulme East swung to Labour.

 indicates seat up for re-election.
 indicates vacant seat.

Elections in 2020s

May 2022

May 2021

Elections in 2010s

May 2019

May 2018

May 2016

May 2015

May 2014

May 2012

May 2011

May 2010

Elections in 2000s

May 2008

May 2007

May 2006

May 2004

May 2003

May 2002

May 2000

Elections in 1990s

Elections in 1980s

Elections in 1970s

References

External links
Trafford Council

Wards of Trafford
1974 establishments in England